Melkikh (from мелкий meaning small) is a gender-neutral Russian surname.

References

Russian-language surnames